The Prime Minister is a novel by Anthony Trollope, first published in 1876. It is the fifth of the "Palliser" series of novels.

Synopsis
When neither the Whigs nor the Tories are able to form a government on their own, a fragile compromise coalition government is formed, with Plantagenet Palliser, the wealthy and hard-working Duke of Omnium, installed as Prime Minister of the United Kingdom. The Duchess, formerly Lady Glencora Palliser, attempts to support her husband by hosting lavish parties at Gatherum Castle in Barsetshire, the family's largest country house, barely used until now.  Palliser, initially unsure that he is fit to lead, grows to enjoy his high office, but becomes increasingly distressed when his government proves to be too weak and divided to accomplish anything. His own inflexible nature does not help.

A significant sub-plot centres on Ferdinand Lopez, a financially overextended City adventurer of undisclosed parentage and doubtful ethnicity (possibly Jewish), who wins the favour of Emily Wharton. She marries him despite her father's objections in preference to Arthur Fletcher, who has always been in love with her. As in Trollope's earlier Palliser novel Can You Forgive Her?, in which the heroine also has to choose between two suitors, the enticing and charismatic suitor is revealed to have many unpleasant traits, and Emily soon has cause to regret her choice. Lopez meets the Duchess at one of her parties, and Glencora unwisely encourages him to stand for Parliament. He campaigns against Arthur Fletcher, but withdraws from the contest when he sees he has no chance of winning. Lopez writes to the Duke, insisting on being reimbursed for his election expenses since the Duchess had led him to believe that he would have the Duke's endorsement (despite having his expenses already paid in full by his father-in-law).

The Duke is furious with Glencora, who disobeyed his explicit order not to interfere in the election, but his strong sense of personal honour forces him to give in to Lopez's desperate and unseemly demands. This causes a minor political scandal when it becomes known, as it appears to many people that Palliser used his great influence and wealth to try to buy a seat in Parliament for a supporter. This causes the Duke great unhappiness, but he is stoutly defended in the House of Commons by Phineas Finn, eponymous hero of Phineas Finn and Phineas Redux, two earlier books in the Palliser series.

Lopez's high-risk gambles lead to his financial ruin and, after trying to persuade the wealthy Lizzie Eustace (protagonist of The Eustace Diamonds) to run away with him to Guatemala, a proposition she somewhat contemptuously rejects, he takes his own life by throwing himself in front of a train.  After a period of mourning, Emily is persuaded, without too much difficulty, to marry Arthur Fletcher.

Eventually the coalition government breaks apart and the Duke resigns, with both regret and relief, and withdraws into private life, hoping to be of use to his party again in the future.

References

External links
 
 
 
 

1876 British novels
Novels by Anthony Trollope
Novels first published in serial form
British political novels
Chapman & Hall books